"A Woman Always Knows" is a song written by Billy Sherrill, and recorded by American country music artist David Houston. It was released in December 1970 as the second single and title track from his album A Woman Always Knows. The song peaked at number 2 on the Billboard Hot Country Singles chart. It also reached number 1 on the RPM Country Tracks chart in Canada.

Chart performance

References

1970 singles
David Houston (singer) songs
Songs written by Billy Sherrill
Epic Records singles
1970 songs